Zoe LaVerne Pemberton (born June 3, 2001), is an American TikTok influencer, YouTuber, Internet personality and singer from the United States.

Early life 
Zoe LaVerne was born on June 3, 2001, in Greenwood, Indiana, US. She grew up in a small town with her parents and three siblings. 

LaVerne had an interest in social media from a young age and began experimenting with creating content on various platforms. She attended a local high school in her hometown and completed her education in 2019.

Career 
Zoe LaVerne began her social media career by creating lip-sync videos on Musical.ly (now known as TikTok). Her early content was well-received by the audience, and she gained a steady following. 

Zoe's popularity on the app grew rapidly, and she started gaining millions of followers within a few months.

One of Zoe's most popular videos was a lip-sync to the song "Juicy" by Doja Cat. The video went viral, and Zoe's followers increased by thousands. 

Since then, Zoe has been creating a variety of content, including dance videos, comedy sketches, and vlogs. Her relatable content and charismatic personality have helped her become one of the most popular creators on TikTok.

Personal life
LaVerne married Dawson Day on October 5, 2021, according to her Instagram. She gave birth to her first child Emersyn Raylee Day in that same year.

References

2001 births
American TikTokers
American YouTubers
Living people
People from Indiana
Social media influencers
YouTube vloggers
21st-century American women singers
21st-century American singers
Singers from Indiana